Carinha de Anjo (lit. Angel Face) is a Brazilian children's telenovela created by Rosy Ocampo and written by Íris Abravanel, originally broadcast on SBT In between November 21, 2016 and June 6, 2018. It is a Brazilian remake of the Mexican telenovela Carita de ángel produced by Televisa in 2000.

The plot features Lorena Queiroz, Bia Arantes, Carlo Porto, Priscila Sol, Dani Gondim, Karin Hils, Eliana Guttman and Lucero in the lead roles. Also in the other roles are Sienna Belle, Renata Randel, Maisa Silva and Jean Paulo Campos.

Plot
After two years enrolled in a Catholic boarding school in Europe, five-year-old Dulce Maria reunites with her father Gustavo Larios, a successful businessman who's finally recovered from his wife's death. Gustavo is determined to restart his life with Dulce Maria along with his new girlfriend Nicole, a woman only interested in his wealth. Dulce Maria rejects the idea of Gustavo and Nicole's relationship and takes refuge in the arms of Cecilia, a nun that fills Dulce Maria's motherly void. Dulce Maria dreams that her father and Cecilia fall in love, and with Gustavo's ingenuity, fantasy slowly turns into a reality, even when Cecilia is divided between her faith and feelings.

Cast

Children

Adults

Gallery

See also 
 Carita de ángel - telenovela produced by Televisa in 2000

References

External links 
  

2016 telenovelas
Brazilian telenovelas
2016 Brazilian television series debuts
2018 Brazilian television series endings
Sistema Brasileiro de Televisão telenovelas
Children's telenovelas
Brazilian television series based on Mexican television series
Portuguese-language telenovelas
Television series about children